Daya Shankar Pandey (born 19 November 1965) is an Indian film and television actor. He has acted in a number of Hindi movies like Lagaan (2001), Gangaajal (2003), Swades (2004) and Raajneeti (2010). He began his career with the film Pehla Nasha (1993). He currently essays the role of Inspector Chalu Pandey in the famous serial Taarak Mehta Ka Ooltah Chashmah. He is also creative consultant of the show.Daya Shankar Pandey resides in Mumbai's Suburban Area.

Filmography

Television

Web series

Awards and nominations

References

External links 
 

Male actors from Mumbai
1965 births
Living people
Male actors in Hindi television
Male actors in Hindi cinema
20th-century Indian male actors
21st-century Indian male actors